News Today is an English language evening daily newspaper in Chennai, India. It is published from India every evening since 1982.

References

Newspapers published in Chennai
Publications established in 1982
Evening newspapers published in India
1982 establishments in Tamil Nadu